Revel in Romance is an American pop rock band out of Atlanta, Georgia, United States. It consists of lead vocalist Saxony Raine, lead guitarist Devin Maier, rhythm guitarist Parker Rehklau, bassist Remington Rehklau, and drummer Mark Robinson.

History
In early 2013, Revel in Romance began writing, rehearsing and playing as an acoustic trio with lead vocalist Saxony Raine, rhythm guitarist Parker and lead guitarist Devin. The trio released their first acoustic EP, Stripped, in 2014 with producer Ralph Cacciurri. Before too long, they decided on a fuller sound and added bassist Remington and Mark on drums.

In May 2014, they played their first full band show as Revel in Romance. In February 2015, their debut single, "Little Love", produced by Jan Smith and Shawn Grove, was released as an introduction to their new sound.

Their debut EP Right and Wrong was released in 2016, also with producer Jan Smith, Jesse Owen Astin and Shawn Grove, and music video release of their single "Echoes" set them on a path to perform throughout the United States playing SXSW, Warped Tour, Summerfest, SweetWater 420 Fest, Athfest, Mesa Music Fest and more. They made their television debut in February 2018 with 11 Alive on NBC.

In 2018, they released "When You Left", the newest single leading up to their EP 'Smoke and Mirrors' released in 2019. 

Singles "For a Minute" was released in 2020 and "Knowing You" in 2021.

Discography

References

Musical groups from Atlanta
Musical groups established in 2013
American pop rock music groups
2013 establishments in Georgia (U.S. state)